St Davids Lifeboat Station (based in St Justinian, St Davids, Pembrokeshire, Wales) is a Royal National Lifeboat Institution (RNLI) station. It was opened in 1869 and to date has been involved in saving over 360 lives at sea in more than 420 launches. The station operates both an all-weather (ALB) and an inshore (ILB) lifeboat.

History

The station was established by the RNLI in 1869 following appeals from local residents after a number of shipwrecks nearby. The Institution had already awarded a silver medal to local man Thomas M Rees for risking his life in an incident in 1867. The station, consisting of a boathouse and slipway at Porthstinan (St Justinians), was provided with the 32-foot Augusta, donated by the Earl of Dartmouth. Augusta remained in service until 1885, saving 23 lives.

From 1885 to 1910, 16 lives were saved by the crew of the station's new lifeboat, Gem. The lifeboat was wrecked on The Bitches reef during a rescue on 13 October 1910, and three crewmen drowned: Coxswain John Stephens, and lifeboatmen Henry Rowlands and James Price. Papers concerning the loss are held at Pembrokeshire Record Office (Ref:DX/93/11). A temporary lifeboat, Charlotte, was stationed at Porthclais for two years; meanwhile, a new station and slipway were constructed to accommodate the station's first motor-powered lifeboat, General Farrell.

General Farrell remained on station until 1936, her crew saving 17 lives in the intervening years. She was replaced by Swn-y-Mor which saw one of the busiest periods in the station's history, her crews saving 108 lives in her 26 years of service which was marked in 1956 by the loss of lifeboatman Ieuan Bateman. A couple of years earlier the tanker World Concord broke in two in hurricane-force winds; a combined effort by St Davids and Rosslare Harbour lifeboats rescued 42 people from the tanker.

Swn-y-Mor had been donated by the Civil Service Lifeboat Fund, and the same institution donated the next lifeboat, Joseph Soar, in 1963. Already fitted with some innovative equipment, she was converted for self-righting in 1974, and during her tenure the crew saved 45 lives. As of 2015, Swn-y-Mor was still operating as a private yacht, rigged as gaff ketch motor sailer.

Joseph Soar was transferred to Dunbar in 1985, and sold by the RNLI in 1992 when she was given a civic send-off at Poole. As of 2012 she was still operating, as a pleasure craft in Northern Ireland, and undergoing a complete refit in 2013. She had the distinction of having one of the longest services (27 years) in the RNLI's history.

From 1985 to 1988 the station's all-weather lifeboat was Ruby & Arthur Reed, formerly on station at Cromer where she had already been involved in saving 58 lives and enabled a further 9 lives to be saved at St Davids. She was replaced by Garside, a new Tyne class lifeboat which, until superseded in 2013 by Tamar class lifeboat Norah Wortley, had been launched more than 160 times.

After the withdrawal of the RAF Rescue Service helicopter from nearby RAF Brawdy, St Davids trialled an inshore lifeboat in 1997, and the following year took possession of a permanent addition to the station of a D-class ILB, Dewi Sant (Saint David). This was replaced in 2008 by Myrtle & Trevor Gurr. The lifeboat station and slipways were modernised extensively in the 1990s. In April 2013 St. David's New  lifeboat was placed on station, temporarily moored afloat pending construction of the new boathouse and slipway. In certain weather conditions, the Tamar had to be removed to a safe anchorage and for this reason the Tyne class Garside remained on station in the 1910s boathouse, with St Davids in the unusual situation of operating two ALBs at the same time.

The new facility is a short distance from the existing boathouse which remained in service until the new boathouse was completed. With completion of the new boathouse, Garside was withdrawn from service and launched down the slipway of the old boathouse for the last time on 21 October 2016 on her way back to the RNLI depot at Poole for decommissioning.

The new Tamar, Norah Wortley, was launched from the new station for the first time on 21 October 2016; her naming ceremony took place on 14 March 2017 on the occasion of the official opening of the new station.

Today
The station employs two full-time members, Coxswain and Mechanic. The remaining crew, who all live within about 3 miles of the station, are volunteers and are contacted by pager when needed.

The lifeboat station is the embarkation point for ferries to Ramsey Island.

Fleet

All Weather Boats

Inshore Lifeboats

Neighbouring Station Locations

See also
 Royal National Lifeboat Institution
 List of RNLI stations
 Royal National Lifeboat Institution lifeboats
 List of Lifeboat Disasters in the British Isles

References

External links

RNLI St Davids - station website
Geograph: photographs of St Davids Lifeboat Station

Lifeboat stations in Wales
Lifeboat Station
Transport infrastructure completed in 1869
1869 establishments in Wales